Mikkelin Palloilijat (or MP) is a Finnish professional football club, based in Mikkeli, that competes in the Ykkönen. The club was founded in 1929 and also included volleyball, bandy and ice hockey sections.

History
In 1998, MP merged with Mikkelin Kissat to form FC Mikkeli. Due to financial difficulties, this union in 2001 was dissolved and the two clubs returned to manage individually. It played in the Finnish First Division (Ykkönen) from 2004 to 2006 but was relegated to Kakkonen at the end of the season. The club gained promotion to Ykkönen by winning the Group A of Kakkonen 2009 but was immediately relegated back to Kakkonen in 2010. The club's manager is Ilkka Mäkelä, and it plays its home matches at Mikkelin Urheilupuisto. In 2015 they got promoted to the Ykkönen again.

Ice hockey departments of MP and local rivals MiPK merged in 1970, creating new club Jukurit. Jukurit has then been quite successful in Finnish amateur levels of ice hockey. However, the only medal on Finnish championship level is still won by MP, a bronze in A-juniors year 1961.

Bandy department of MP was disbanded in 1977. After that colours of Mikkeli on bandy fields have been represented by Mikkelin Kampparit. Kampparit was formed in 1972.

MP was a pioneer of women's football in Finland, forming one of the first ladies team. The spot in Kansallinen Liiga was moved from MP to Porrassalmen Urheilijat-62 in 1992.

Season to season

25 seasons in Veikkausliiga
21 seasons in Ykkönen
31 seasons in Kakkonen
6 seasons in Kolmonen

Current squad

Management and boardroom

Management

References

External links
Official website

Football clubs in Finland
Mikkeli
Association football clubs established in 1929
Bandy clubs established in 1929
1929 establishments in Finland
Defunct bandy clubs in Finland